Leonard Norman Allmond (12 September 1925 – 25 September 2011) was an Australian rugby league footballer who played in the 1940s.

He played in the Souths team that lost the 1949 Grand Final to St George Dragons 19–12. Len Allmond was also a Flight Sergeant for the RAAF during World War II. 

Len Allmond died on 25 September 2011, aged 86 at Daceyville, New South Wales.

References

1925 births
2011 deaths
South Sydney Rabbitohs players
Australian rugby league players
Royal Australian Air Force personnel of World War II
Royal Australian Air Force airmen
Rugby league players from Sydney